The 2022 WDF Europe Cup was the 22nd edition of the WDF Europe Cup organised by the World Darts Federation. The tournament was held first time in history at the Gandía Palace Hotel in Gandía, Spain. Medals were distributed in eight disciplines (singles, pairs, teams and overalls) appropriately for each of the sex. 41 nations participated in this tournament (in six cases only men's representation). England won the medal tally.

Medal tally

Qualifiers
Following players was qualified for the tournament:

Men's singles (Last 32 onwards)

Women's singles (Last 32 onwards)

Men's pairs (Last 16 onwards)

Women's pairs (Last 16 onwards)

Men's team (Last 16 onwards)

Women's team (Last 16 onwards)

Overall champions

References

2022 in darts
WDF
WDF
WDF